Giedrius  Žibėnas (born 6 April 1984) is a Lithuanian professional basketball coach. He currently serves as a head coach for Rytas Vilnius of the Lithuanian basketball League.

Coaching career
Giedrius Žibėnas on 2012 started his coaching career in Šakių Zanavykas Basketball club of the NKL.
On 2020 he signed with Rytas Vilnius as assistant coach for Donaldas Kairys. On 2021 he replaced Donaldas Kairys and became Head Coach of team Rytas Vilnius. Later that season Giedrius  Žibėnas signed new 1 year contract with Rytas Vilnius.

References

External links

1984 births
Living people
BC Rytas coaches
Lithuanian basketball coaches